George Thomas, nicknamed Jaharai Jung and Jahazi Sahib, (22 August 1802) was an Irish mercenary and later a Raja who was active in 18th-century India. From 1798 to 1801, he ruled a small kingdom in India, which he carved out of Hisar and Rohtak districts of Haryana. He is popularly known as the Raja from Tipperary.

Early life
Thomas was born in Roscrea, Tipperary, Ireland, where his father was a poor Catholic tenant farmer near Roscrea who died when George was a child. Originally forced to press-gang at Youghal, where he worked as a labourer on the docks, Thomas deserted from the British Navy at the age of 25 in Madras in 1782. Still illiterate at the age of 32, he led a group of Pindaris north to Delhi by 1787, where he took service under Begum Samru of Sardhana.

Though he was the favourite general of Begum Samru, due to jealous intrigues of his French rival Le Vassoult (committed suicide in 1795) he was supplanted in 1792 in her favour. He then transferred his allegiance to Apa Khande Rao, a Maratha chieftain under Mahadaji Scindia of Gwalior State. He worked for Apa Khande Rao for four years from 1793 to 1797 to conquer Haryana by subduing Rajputs of Rajasthan, Kachawa Shekhawat thakur rulers of Haryana and Shekhawati, Mughals under vizir Mirza Najaf Khan and Bhatti Muslim Rajputs.

In return for service to the Marathas, he was made the jagir of Jhajjar. Here he constructed a fort known as Georgegah, which was locally known as Jahazgarh.

Raja of Hansi

On the death of his patron Apa Khande Rao in 1797, Thomas declared independence from the Marathas. He quickly took possession of Rohtak and Hisar and made Hansi as his capital. Later that year his requests to the Chiefs of the Phulkian Misl for assistance against the Marathas were rejected. He thereafter launched a campaign against Jind whilst the Phulkian Chief's was in Lahore. Despite lifting his siege of Jind, Thomas, and his forces were forced to flee from Sikh forces during a night attack, forcing Thomas to sue for peace. The peace only lasted until 1799, when the Phulkian Misl launched further expeditions against neighbouring Jind and Kythal and decimated portions of Thomas's large army. In January 1800 he invaded Patiala but was repelled by the Sidhu's of Patiala.

During his short period of rule, he established a mint in Hansi and released rupees of his own kingdom. His area of control included area from Ghaggar river in the north to Beri in south and from Meham in the east to Bhadra in west. He rebuilt the Asigarh Fort at Hansi, which was in ruined state and built defensive walls and fortifications. He divided his area of control into 4 small paraganas. Historian Jadunath Sarkar (1870–1958) describes his conquests as "Oval in shape, with ill-defined and ever-shifting frontiers, it extended 13 to 28 miles in different directions. On the north lay the Ghaggar river which separates it from the lands under Sikh occupation; the west the country of predatory Bhatti tribes, beyond which lay the deserts of Bikaner. The south was bounded by the Rewari district." He raised an army of eight battalions of infantry comprising 6000 men, fifty pieces of cannon, 1000 cavalry, including the Jats who made up two battalions of Infantry and one-fourth of his cavalry (paid pensions to them and encouraged them to settle in Hariana, colonisation of land through pensions to sipahis contributed to Hariana becoming a stable military labour market in the 1790s), 1500 Rohilla Muslims and 2000 soldiers guarding his several forts.

He styled himself as the Raja of Hansi and he also liked to introduce himself as Raja from Tipperary. He marched on the kingdoms of Jaipur, Bikaner and Udaipur and was sometimes victorious. George told his biographer, William Francklin,  
"I established my capital, rebuilt the walls long since decayed, and repaired the fortifications (of the 12th century fort of Prithiviraj Chauhan). As it had been long deserted, at first I found difficulty in providing for inhabitants. But by decrees, I selected between five and six thousand persons to whom I allowed every lawful indulgence. I established a mint and coined my own rupees, which I made current in my army and country; as from the commencement of my career at Jhajhar I had resolved to establish independence. I employed workmen and artificers of all kinds. I cast my own artillery, commenced making muskets, matchlocks and powder and in short, made the best preparations for carrying on an offensive and defensive war."

Between 1798 and 1801, he built Jahaj Kothi (c. 1796) and Jahaj Pul at Hisar, Haryana which was his residence, which was also used by James Skinner after George's defeat. He ruled the area independently up to 1801, when he was driven out by the Sikhs. At Hansi, he was finally defeated and captured by Patiala's army under General Sahib Singh and has his guns, throne and crown stripped off him. Here he abandoned all his conquests and retired east into British territory.

Death
He died, at Baharampur near Murshidabad in Bengal, of a fever on board his boat on his way to Calcutta down the Ganges river on 22 August 1802. He is buried in a grave at Residency Cemetery, Babulbona in Baharampur.

Legacy
The Jahaj Kothi Museum, formerly George's residence, is named for him, as is Jahaj Pul suburb in Hisar of Haryana state in India.

George met his biographer William Francklin on the way to Berhampur shortly before his death, and narrated his exploits to William, who published George's biography "Military memoirs of George Thomas" in 1805, based on direct interaction and original documents.

James Skinner, while serving the Marathas, had earlier fought against George Thomas. After George's defeat, Skinner lived at Jahaj kothi in Hisar. Skinner himself died at Hansi on 4 December 1841, at the age of 64.

See also
Maratha Empire
Company rule in India

References

Further reading
William Francklin, 1805, "Military memoirs of George Thomas" biography
Hennessy, MN "George Thomas – the Rajah from Tipperary", London, Sidgwick and Jackson, 1971. 
"George Thomas – the Rajah from Tipperary", The Calcutta Review, No. CXL (1880) (reprint of H. G. Keene, George Thomas – An episode from the Great Anarchy)
Bidwell, Shelford, Swords for hire: European Mercenaries in Eighteenth Century India (1971). John Murray.
Haefs, Gisbert, Raja (2000), btb Verlag, a historical novel in German

People from Hisar (city)
1802 deaths
1756 births
Irish mercenaries
Mercenaries in India
Businesspeople from Haryana
18th-century Indian people
18th-century Irish people
People from Roscrea